Joseph Constantine Carpue (4 May 1764 – 30 January 1846) was an English surgeon who was born in London. He was associated with St George's Hospital and Duke of York Hospital in Chelsea. He was a skilled surgeon and popular lecturer of anatomy.

Carpue is known for performing the first rhinoplastic surgery in England, using a technique created in India several centuries earlier. The Indian rhinoplastic reconstruction involved using a flap of skin taken from the forehead, and was to become known in Europe as "Carpue's operation". In 1816 Carpue described the procedure in his publication of Account of Two Successful Operations for Restoring a Lost Nose from the Integument of the Forehead.

Carpue was also a pioneer in experimentation with electricity in medicine, which he detailed in his treatise of An Introduction to Electricity and Galvanism, with Cases showing their Effects in the Cure of Disease.

Works
 1801- Description of the Muscles of the Human Body
 1803- An Introduction to Electricity and Galvanism, with Cases showing their Effects in the Cure of Disease
 1816- An Account of Two Successful Operations for Restoring a Lost Nose from the Integument of the Forehead
 1819- History of the High Operation for the Stone, by Inscision above the Pubis

See also 
 Gaspare Tagliacozzi

External links

1764 births
1846 deaths
English surgeons
Medical doctors from London
Fellows of the Royal Society